Biya may refer to:

Places
 Biya (river), a tributary of the Ob in Siberia, Russia;
 Al Hoceima or Biya, a Moroccan port on the Mediterranean Sea;

People
 Paul Biya (born 1933), president of Cameroon 1982–present
 Jeanne-Irène Biya (1935–1992), first wife of Paul Biya
 Chantal Biya (born 1969), second wife of Paul Biya
 Syed Ibrahim Malik Biya (c.1315–1351), general for Muhammad bin Tughluq, northern India

Other
 Grand Prix Chantal Biya, a professional bicycle road race in Cameroon
 Biya (also spelled Bia), a Filipino name for the Long-finned goby